The 1949 Illinois Fighting Illini football team was an American football team that represented the University of Illinois during the 1949 Big Nine Conference football season.  In their eighth year under head coach Ray Eliot, the Illini compiled a 3–4–2 record and finished in fifth place in the Big Ten Conference. Halfback Johnny Karras was selected as the team's most valuable player.

Schedule

References

Illinois
Illinois Fighting Illini football seasons
Illinois Fighting Illini football